Neil Harold Buchanan is an American economist, legal scholar, and professor.  He is currently a Professor of Law at University of Florida Levin College of Law in Gainesville, Florida, specializing in tax policy and tax law.

Background

Education and personal life
Buchanan was born on April 20, 1959 in Hartford, Connecticut, United States. He received his A.B. in Economics from Vassar College in 1981. He then received his PhD in Economics and his A.M. in Economics from Harvard, where he also spent time teaching undergraduate courses and working at think-tanks.

After starting his career as an economics professor, Buchanan changed directions and received his J.D. from University of Michigan's Law School in 2002. Then in 2017, he received his second Ph.D. in Laws with a specialization in public policy from Monash University (Melbourne, Australia)

 Vassar College, A.B. in Economics
 Harvard University, A.M. in Economics, Ph.D. in Economics
 University of Michigan Law School, J.D.
 Monash University, Ph.D. in Laws

Judicial clerkship 
From 2002 to 2003, Buchanan was a judicial clerk for the United States Court of Appeals for the Tenth Circuit in the chambers of Judge Robert H. Henry in Oklahoma City.

Academic Expertise - Economics & Legal Scholarship
Buchanan's research focuses on the long-term tax and spending patterns of the federal government. Buchanan and his co-author, Michael C. Dorf of Cornell Law School, are leading academic experts on the U.S. debt ceiling, especially its constitutional implications. They are often cited, both individually and together, in notable publications.

Buchanan has also written extensively on the fiscal health and intergenerational implications of the U.S. Social Security system, the debt and the deficit, and other topics.  His latest work, Social Security is Fair to All Generations: Demystifying the Trust Fund, Solvency, and the Promise to Younger Americans, was published by the Cornell Journal of Law & Public Policy in 2018, refutes claims that the Social Security system unfairly transferred wealth from younger generations to Baby Boomers.

He has also become a frequent speaker abroad, having been invited as a guest lecturer and visiting scholar at universities and other educational organizations in Australia, Austria, Canada, Hong Kong, Korea, Japan, England, New Zealand, Spain, and Sweden.

Buchanan has been a full-time faculty member in the Economics departments of Wellesley College, Goucher College, and the University of Wisconsin at Milwaukee.  He has been a visiting or adjunct professor at the University of Utah, the University of California at Berkeley, Towson University, Bard College, and Barnard College.  He served on the faculty at Rutgers University Law School, and was a visiting professor at New York University School of Law and a visiting scholar at Cornell Law School. Currently, Buchanan teaches at The University of Florida Levin College of Law, specializing in tax policy and tax law.

Publications & Other Works

Selected Published Articles 
 Social Security is Fair to All Generations: Demystifying the Trust Fund, Solvency, and the Promise to Younger Americans, 27 Cornell Journal of Law & Public Policy 3 (Winter 2017).
 Don't End or Audit the Fed: Central Bank Independence in an Age of Austerity (with Michael C. Dorf), 102 Cornell Law Review 1 (2016)
 What Kind of Environment Do We Owe Future Generations? 15 Lewis & Clark Law Review 339 (2011)
 Good Deficits: Protecting the Public Interest from Deficit Hysteria,  31 Virginia Tax Review 75 (2011)
 What Do We Owe Future Generations? 77 George Washington Law Review 1237 (2009)
 “Generational Theft”?  U.S. Fiscal Policy Does Not Cheat Future Generations, Challenge: The Magazine of Economic Affairs [peer-reviewed], Volume 52, No. 5, September - October 2009, pp. 44–54
 (With Dorf, Michael C.) "Borrowing by Any Other Name: Why Presidential 'Spending Cuts' Would Still Exceed the Debt Ceiling," 114 Columbia Law Review Sidebar 44-70 (Mar. 11, 2014).
 (With Dorf, Michael C.) "Bargaining in the Shadow of the Debt Ceiling: When Negotiating Over Spending and Tax Laws, Congress and the President Should Consider the Debt Ceiling a Dead letter," 113 Columbia Law Review Sidebar 32-54 (Mar. 5, 2013).
 (With Dorf, Michael C.) "How to Choose the Least Unconstitutional Option: Lessons for the President (and Others) from the Debt Ceiling Standoff," 112 Columbia Law Review 1175-1243 (2012).
 (With Dorf, Michael C.) "Nullifying the Debt Ceiling Threat Once and For All: Why the President Should Embrace the Least Unconstitutional Option," 112 Columbia Law Review Sidebar 237-249 (Dec. 21, 2012).
 "Separation of Powers Gives the President Power on Debt," New York Times (Jan. 15, 2013).

Selected Expert Testimony & Consultation to Governments 
 Explanation of debt ceiling and related issues, Macroeconomics and Finance Department, Embassy of France, Washington DC, January 16, 2013.
 Written and Oral testimony, Hearing on “How the Tax Code’s Burdens on Individuals and Families Demonstrate the Need for Comprehensive Tax Reform,” Committee on Ways and Means, U.S. House of Representatives, April 13, 2011

References

1959 births
George Washington University Law School faculty
Goucher College faculty and staff
Harvard Law School alumni
Living people
Monash Law School alumni
Lawyers from Hartford, Connecticut
University of Michigan Law School alumni
University of Wisconsin–Milwaukee faculty
Vassar College alumni
Wellesley College faculty
People from Maumee, Ohio
Economists from Ohio
Economists from Connecticut
21st-century American economists